Via Mala is a 1985 television series, based on the 1934 novel Via Mala by John Knittel. It was made as a co-production between West Germany, France, Italy and Austria. The novel had previously been made into two films Via Mala (1945) and Via Mala (1961).

Synopsis 
Jonas Lauretz the owner of a sawmill in a village in Switzerland is a tyrannical person disliked by all his family and neighbours. When he is killed, almost everyone is suspected of murdering him before prime suspicion falls on his daughter.

Partial cast 

 Mario Adorf as Jonas Lauretz 
 Maruschka Detmers as Silvie Lauretz 
 Milena Vukotic as Sophie Lauretz 
 Dominique Pinon as Niklaus Lauretz 
 Hans Christian Blech as Maler Lauters 
 Juraj Kukura as Andreas von Richenau 
 Sissy Höfferer as Hanna Lauretz 
 Fritz Eckhardt as Kreispräsident Bonatsch 
 Jean-Paul Comart as Georg Gumpers 
 Beppe Chierici as Jöry Wagner 
 Jutta Maria Luser as Klara 
 Ingrid Burkhard as Frau Gumpers 
 Sylvie Granotier as Luise 
 Eva Zilcher as Baronin von Richenau 
 Georg Marischka as Dr. Gutknecht 
 Robert Dietl as Baron von Richenau 
 Bruno Dallansky as Schmid
 Siegfried Meisner as Wohl 
 Hanno Pöschl as Wirt 
 Bert Fortell as Lehmann 
 Balthasar Burkhard as Zirreder

References

Bibliography 
 Goble, Alan. The Complete Index to Literary Sources in Film. Walter de Gruyter, 1999.

External links 
 

1985 Austrian television series debuts
1985 German television series debuts
1985 French television series debuts
1985 Italian television series debuts
French crime drama television series
Films based on works by John Knittel
Films set in Switzerland
Television series set in the 1930s
1980s Austrian television series
1980s German television miniseries
1980s French television miniseries
1980s Italian television miniseries
Television shows based on Swiss novels
German-language television shows
ZDF original programming